The 	Amazonian elaenia  or Amazonian gray elaenia (Myiopagis cinerea) is a species of bird in the family Tyrannidae.  It is found in Amazonia from eastern Colombia and southern Venezuela, to eastern Ecuador, northeastern Peru, and northwestern Brazil.  Its natural habitat is subtropical or tropical moist lowland forest.

References

Myiopagis
Birds described in 1868